Aulnay (pronounced ɔnɛ, the "l" is mute) is a commune in the Aube department in the Grand Est region of north-central France.

The inhabitants of the commune are known as Aulnaysiens.

Geography
Aulnay is located some 28 km east by south-east of Arcis-sur-Aube, 16 km north-west of Brienne-le-Château, and 50 km west by south-west of Saint-Dizier. Access to the commune is by the D 35 road from Jasseines in the north which passes through the west of the commune and the village before it continues south to Chalette-sur-Voire. The D 5 road comes from Brillecourt in the west and passes through the village before continuing east to Braux. South of the village is the hamlet of Petit Aulnay. Apart from a belt of trees along the river the commune is entirely farmland.

The Ravet river flows through the commune from east to west forming part of the south-facing border in both the east and west of the commune before continuing west to join the Aube at Brillecourt.

Neighbouring communes and villages

Administration

List of Successive Mayors

Demography
In 2017 the commune had 129 inhabitants.

Culture and heritage

Civil heritage
The town hall contains 4 Stained glass windows (16th century) which are registered as an historical object.

Religious heritage

The Church of Saint-Rémy was built in the 16th century but collapsed in recent years. There are only the remains of the Romansesque Nave which was rebuilt in the 18th century.

The Parish Church contains many items that are registered as historical objects:
A Tombstone (16th century) (destroyed)
An Eagle Lectern (19th century)
A Statue: Christ on the Cross (16th century)
A Tabernacle (18th century)
A Statue: Saint-Rémy (16th century)
A Statue: Sainte-Savine (16th century)
A Statuette: Saint-Jean-Baptiste (16th century) (disappeared)
A Statue: Saint-Roch (16th century)
A Statuette: Saint-Antoine (16th century)
A Statue: Virgin and Child (16th century)
An Inscription (1681) (destroyed)
An Altar (19th century)
A Stoup (17th century)
The Furniture in the Church

See also
Communes of the Aube department

References

External links
Aulnay on the old IGN website 
Aulnay on Géoportail, National Geographic Institute (IGN) website 
Aulnay on the 1750 Cassini Map

Communes of Aube